St. Peter's by-the-Sea Episcopal Church, also known as St. Peter's by the Sea or St. Peter's Episcopal Church, is a historic church building at 611 Lincoln Street in Sitka, Alaska.  It is a Gothic Revival structure, built of stone and wood, with a modest bell tower topped by a pyramidal roof.  The basement and more than half of the main floor's height are fieldstone with timbered elements, above which is wood framing clad in wooden shingles.  Three stone buttresses line the side of the church, separating four rectangular windows with half-round windows directly above.  The rose window of the church includes a Star of David.  The church was built in 1899, and was the first substantial Episcopal church in Sitka, which had previously held services in smaller locations.

The church was listed on the National Register of Historic Places (as "St. Peter's Church") in 1978.  The adjoining See House is separately listed on the National Register.

See also
National Register of Historic Places listings in Sitka City and Borough, Alaska

References

Further reading

19th-century Episcopal church buildings
Buildings and structures in Sitka, Alaska
Episcopal church buildings in Alaska
Churches completed in 1899
1899 establishments in Alaska